The Arrondissement of Ath is one of the seven administrative arrondissements in the Walloon province of Hainaut, Belgium. It is not a judicial arrondissement. Two of its municipalities, Brugelette and Chièvres, are part of the Judicial Arrondissement of Mons, while the others are part of the Judicial Arrondissement of Tournai.

Municipalities

The Administrative Arrondissement of Ath consists of the following municipalities:

Since 2019 
 Ath
 Belœil
 Bernissart
 Brugelette
 Chièvres
 Ellezelles
 Enghien
 Flobecq
 Frasnes-lez-Anvaing
 Lessines
 Silly

Before 2019 
 Ath
 Belœil
 Bernissart
 Brugelette
 Chièvres
 Ellezelles
 Flobecq
 Frasnes-lez-Anvaing

The three municipalities of the Arrondissement of Soignies (Enghien, Lessines and Silly) are integrated into the Arrondissement of Ath on January 1, 2019.

References 

Ath